Alan Buckley (23 October 1941 – 12 March 2008) was an English rugby union, and professional rugby league footballer who played in the 1950s, 1960s and 1970s. He played club level rugby union (RU) for Broughton Park RUFC, and representative level rugby league (RL) for Great Britain and England, and at club level for Swinton, as a left-, i.e. number 4. Buckley joined Swinton ("the Lions") from Broughton Park RUFC in Chorlton-cum-Hardy near the end of the 1950s, and was virtually an overnight sensation at Station Road tearing through opposing defences with his blistering pace and determined running.

Background
Buckley was born in Ardwick, Lancashire, England, and he died aged 66 in Walkden, Greater Manchester, England.

Playing career

International honours
Buckley won a cap for England while at Swinton in 1968 against Wales (sub), and won caps for Great Britain while at Swinton in 1963 against Australia, in 1964 against France, in 1965 against New Zealand, and in 1966 against France, on the 1966 Great Britain Lions tour against Australia (2 matches), and New Zealand.

Four Swinton ("the Lions") players took part in the 1966 Great Britain Lions tour to Australasia, they were; Alan Buckley, Ken Gowers (vice-captain), Dave Robinson and John Stopford.

County Cup Final appearances
Buckley played left-, i.e. number 4, in Swinton's 9-15 defeat by St. Helens in the 1960 Lancashire County Cup Final during the 1960–61 season at Central Park, Wigan on Saturday 29 October 1960, played left-, i.e. number 4, in the 4–7 defeat by St. Helens in the 1962 Lancashire County Cup Final during the 1962–63 season at Central Park, Wigan on Saturday 27 October 1962, played left-, i.e. number 4, in the 4-12 defeat by St. Helens in the 1964 Lancashire County Cup Final during the 1964–65 season at Central Park, Wigan on Saturday 24 October 1964, played left-, i.e. number 4, in the 11–2 victory over Leigh in the 1969 Lancashire County Cup Final during the 1969–70 season at Central Park, Wigan on Saturday 1 November 1969, and played left-, i.e. number 4, in the 11–25 defeat by Salford in the 1972 Lancashire County Cup Final during the 1972–73 season at Central Park, Wigan on Saturday 21 October 1972.

BBC2 Floodlit Trophy Final appearances
Buckley played left-, i.e. number 4, in Swinton's 2–7 defeat by Castleford in the 1966 BBC2 Floodlit Trophy Final during the 1966–67 season at Wheldon Road, Castleford on Tuesday 20 December 1966.

References

External links
(archived by archive.is) Alan Buckley was 'a hell of a centre'

1941 births
2008 deaths
England national rugby league team players
English rugby league players
English rugby union players
Great Britain national rugby league team players
People from Ardwick
Rugby league centres
Rugby league players from Manchester
Rugby union players from Manchester
Swinton Lions players